The Girls' 200 metres at the 2013 World Youth Championships in Athletics was held on 12, 13 and 14 July.

Medalists

Records
Prior to the competition, the following records were as follows.

Final
Wind: –0,1

References

2013 World Youth Championships in Athletics